Journal of Research in Crime and Delinquency is a peer-reviewed academic journal that publishes papers in the field of Criminology. The journal's editors Jean McGloin (University of Maryland) and Chris Sullivan (University of Missouri–St. Louis). It has been in publication since 1964 and is currently published by SAGE Publications.

Scope 
Journal of Research in Crime and Delinquency (JRCD) publishes articles, research notes and review essays within the criminal justice field. The journal provides an international forum for exploring the social, political and economic contexts of criminal justice and the discussion and dissemination of research and studies within the field.

Abstracting and indexing 
Journal of Research in Crime and Delinquency is abstracted and indexed in, among other databases:  SCOPUS, and the Social Sciences Citation Index. According to the Journal Citation Reports, its 2017 impact factor is 2.889, ranking it 7 out of 61 journals in the category ‘Criminology & Penology’.

References

External links 
 

SAGE Publishing academic journals
English-language journals
Criminology journals
Quarterly journals
Publications established in 1964